"Perfect Situation" is a song by American alternative rock band Weezer. It was released to radio on October 11, 2005 as the third single from the band's fifth album Make Believe, following "Beverly Hills" and "We Are All on Drugs".

The song is also one of the band's most successful songs to date, topping the Billboard Modern Rock Tracks for four weeks, outlasting the one-week run atop the chart of "Beverly Hills", although it didn't gain the former's massive pop success, reaching #51 on the Billboard Hot 100.

Radio edit
The radio edit of this song features a shortened intro, a synth track on the first and second chorus (the album version only has it on the second chorus), a reworked "oh-oh" chorus and the added backup vocals of "perfect situation" over the outro. The radio edit is eight seconds shorter than the album version. The reworked chorus that appears in the radio edit was one of two ways Cuomo originally wrote the song. When touring in summer 2005, when the band prompted the crowd to sing along, they oddly enough sang it in the other way Cuomo had written it (different from the record version). Cuomo stated in an interview during the band's 2005 performance at the AOL Sessions as saying "Well, if these ten thousand people think it should go this way, maybe we should go back and re-record it."

The alternate version was put on later pressings of the album with the full intro, reworked chorus and outro.

Music video
The video, directed by Marc Webb, premiered on November 11, 2005, and features actress Elisha Cuthbert as the lead singer of Weeze, a fictional predecessor to Weezer, who is eventually replaced by actual frontman Rivers Cuomo. The video also features a cameo by the band's webmaster/band photographer/archivist and longtime close friend Karl Koch and like the "Beverly Hills" video, the band invited actual Weezer fans via casting call to be in the video's crowd scenes. A new cover for Make Believe was created for the video of Perfect Situation, replacing Cuomo with Cuthbert, as well as showing the fictional name "Weeze".

Chart performance

Weekly charts

Year-end charts

Personnel
Rivers Cuomo – lead vocals, lead guitar, keyboards
Brian Bell – rhythm guitar
Scott Shriner – bass guitar
Patrick Wilson – drums, percussion
Rick Rubin – production

References

External links
Lyrics for "Perfect Situation"

Weezer songs
2005 singles
Songs written by Rivers Cuomo
Song recordings produced by Rick Rubin
Music videos directed by Marc Webb
2004 songs